Ogygoptynx is an extinct genus of owl from the Paleocene. Dated to the Late Paleocene, this is the earliest known owl fossil, with a single species assigned to the taxon: Ogygoptynx wetmorei.

References
Rich, Patricia Vickers & David J. Bohaska, 1981. The Ogygoptyngidae, a New Family of Owls from the Paleocene of North America. Alcheringa 5: 95–102. (PDF)
Sankar Chatterjee. The Rise of Birds: 225 Million Years of Evolution, pg. 251.
James R. Duncan. Owls of the World: Their Lives, Behavior and Survival, pg. 72.

Paleocene birds
Extinct birds of North America